Hoda Abdel Hamid is a war correspondent with Al Jazeera.

Biography
She was hired as the Iraq correspondent and then became a Senior International correspondent. Since joining AJE, Hoda has covered major stories around the world. She was one of the main contributor to the channels Arab Spring coverage in Egypt, Tunisia, Libya and Syria. She also covered the Ukraine Revolution in Kiev and then went on to Crimea and eastern Ukraine. She was also In Gaza, Palestine and Israel, South Sudan, South Africa, Brazil, Ethiopia, Afghanistan and Pakistan, the abdication of Pope Benedict XVI and the installation of Pope Francis. Since 2014, she has been documenting the plight of migrants and Refugees arriving in Europe

In December 1998, she was with ABC News and covered Operation Desert Fox in December 1998. She also covered the invasion of Iraq in 2003 and the post-invasion sectarian war.

Since Operation Shock and Awe she has covered the war in Falluja. She was also embedded with Allied forces in Anbar and Tikrit.

For France 3's La Marche du Siècle program she covered Bosnia and Croatia as well as Algeria, Egypt, Sudan, Gaza, Rwanda.

She has won three Emmy awards and an award at the Festival du film de Monaco.

References

External links
 Hoda Abdel Hamid making a quick escape  near Nofaliya in Libya (28 March 2011)

Year of birth missing (living people)
Living people
Women war correspondents
Al Jazeera people
War correspondents of the Iraq War